Nehme is an Arabic unisex given name, meaning "blessing" or "grace".

While originally a given name, Nehme has developed into a common Lebanese surname. Indeed, the Nehme family is believed to stem from the Daou family tree with one of its sons, Nehme Daou, as the father of all Nehme families within the Levant.

Notable people
Naâma (1934–2020), born Halima Echeikh, Tunisian singer
Naïma Laouadi (born 1976), Algerian football player and manager
Neama Riadh (born 1989), Iraqi television presenter
Neemat Frem (born 1967), Lebanese businessman and politician
Ni'ma Abd Nayef al-Jabouri, known as Abu Fatima al-Jaheishi, ISIS member
Nima Abu-Wardeh, Palestinian-British broadcast journalist
Nima Elbagir (born 1978), Sudanese journalist
Noam Shuster-Eliassi, Israeli comedian

See also 
 Nehme (surname), a Lebanese surname
Nimatullah, an Arabic male given name

References

Arabic unisex given names